Martynenko is a Ukrainian surname, derived from the given name Martin. Notable people with the surname include:

 Ihor Martynenko (born 1970), Ukrainian rower
 Mykola Martynenko (born 1961), Ukrainian politician
 Oleksandr Martynenko (disambiguation), multiple individuals
 Vladimir Martynenko (born 1957), Russian sociologist
 Volodymyr Martynenko (1923–1988), Ukrainian diplomat
 Yevhen Martynenko (born 1993), Ukrainian footballer

See also
 

Ukrainian-language surnames
Patronymic surnames
Surnames from given names